Since the initiation of the Fed Cup tournament 1963, 44 tennis players have represented the Australia Fed Cup team in ties. A Fed Cup tie is a contest involving four singles tennis matches and one doubles match in World Group and World Group II competitions from 1995 onwards, and two singles and one doubles matches elsewhere, competed between two Class B members of the ITF. Fed Cup differs from Davis Cup in that ties are played over two days rather than three, that the doubles match is played fifth rather than third, that matches are always best-of-three, and that zonal competition ties never have more than three matches.

Tennis Australia has existed since 1904, but the sport itself has remained popular in Australia since the nineteenth century, mainly due to the fact that the country's climate is recognised as being desirable for outdoor sports. As a result, Australian tennis grew to a point where it is often considered to be one of the most dominant in the world, highlighted by seventeen Fed Cup final appearances with seven wins, and the emergence of celebrated players such as multi Grand Slam titlists and former World No. 1s Margaret Court and Evonne Goolagong. However, since the 1980s the performance of Australian women's singles tennis has fallen considerably. While many players such as Rennae Stubbs and Samantha Stosur enjoyed great success in doubles, no women appeared in the top 20 singles rankings between Elizabeth Smylie in 1987 and Alicia Molik in 2004, and the Fed Cup team was relegated to Zonal Competition for the first time since 1963 in 2004. The decline continued in 2008, when the Australians were unable to even qualify for the Fed Cup zonal competition final, and there were no Australian women in the Year-End Top 50. However, recently there has been a resurgence for Australian tennis, with the Fed Cup team returning to the World Group in 2011 and 2013, and Stosur becoming a consistent top ten singles player and becoming the first Australian woman since 1980 to win a Grand Slam title at the 2011 US Open. Young Australian tennis players such as 2012 Fed Cup debutant Olivia Rogowska and Ashleigh Barty are also considered to make future rises in the rankings.

The Australian team is one of four nations to compete in every edition of the Fed Cup since its initiation; Margaret Court (then known as Margaret Smith), Jan O'Neill and Lesley Turner partook in the first competition. Wendy Turnbull has partaken in the most ties, and has also achieved the most doubles wins and most total wins for an Australian in Fed Cup. Dianne Balestrat, however, holds the record for the most singles wins, though she will be overtaken if active player Samantha Stosur accumulates two more wins to her Fed Cup record.

This list includes all players who have played at least one Fed Cup tie and is initially arranged in alphabetical order according to surname.

Key

Fed Cup players

See also
 List of Australia Davis Cup team representatives

References

Fed Cup
Australian Fed Cup
Tennis
Fed